Václav Černý (26 March 1905, Jizbice – 2 July 1987, Prague) was a Czechoslovak literary scholar, writer and philosopher. He was an enthusiast of Spanish literature and philosophy and translated into Czech a number of literary and philosophical works by Spanish writers as Ortega y Gasset, Unamuno and Cervantes.

Bibliography
 Lidové kořeny současného umění, 1929
 Karel Čapek, 1936
 Esej o básnickém baroku, 1937
 Meditace o romantickém neklidu, 1943
 Boje a směry socialistické kultury, 1946
 Prvý sešit existencialismu, 1947
 Druhý sešit existencialismu, published in 1992 together with „První sešit existencialismu“
 Osobnost tvorba a boj, 1947
 Středověká milostná lyrika, 1948
 Jaroslav Seifert, 1954
 Staročeský mastičkář, 1955
 Lid a literatura ve středověku, zvláště pak v románských zemích, 1958
 Knížka o Babičce, 1963
 Středověké drama, 1964
 Studie ze starší světové literatury, 1969
 Studie a eseje z moderní světové literatury, 1969
 Až do předsíně nebes : čtrnáct studií o baroku našem i cizím, 1972, published in 1996
 O povaze naší kultury, 1981
 Paměti, three parts, originally published abroad, in the Czech Republic between 1992–1993 
 Úvod do literární historie, texts of seminars from years 1969/1970, published posthumously in 1993
 Eseje o české a slovenské próze , 1994
 V zúženém prostoru, 1994
 Skutečnost a svoboda, 1995
 Vývoj a zločiny panslavismu, 1995

References

1905 births
1987 deaths
People from Náchod
Czechoslovak writers
Czechoslovak scientists
Existentialists
Czechoslovak philosophers
Charter 77 signatories